The Safe Sidewalk Vending Act is a 2018 California law decriminalizing street vending and legalizing street vending under certain conditions.

The purpose of SB 946 is to decriminalize and legalize street vending throughout the state.

The proposal defines “sidewalk vendor” as a person who sells merchandise or food from a pushcart, stand, display, pedal-driven cart, wagon, showcase, rack, or other non-motorized conveyance on a sidewalk or pedestrian path. SB 946 states a vendor can be a “roaming sidewalk vendor”, which is someone who moves around to vend, or a “stationary vendor”, someone who just stays in one place to vend. SB 946 applies to charter cities in terms of local authority.

The purpose of SB 946 is to let local law enforcement not fine or regulate street vendors where sidewalk traffic is light and is not infringing upon activity within the area. If local authorities wish to regulate sidewalk vending, they have to be consistent with SB 946. If a city does not have any sidewalk vending legislations and wishes to implement new ones, they also have to be consistent with SB 946. If local authorities have regulations that are consistent with SB 946, no further action is needed. If they have regulations that are not consistent with SB 946, adjustments to these laws will have to be adjusted.

Any sidewalk vending regulations that are adopted or enforced by local authority must follow specific standards

"SB 946 also imposes time, place, and manner restrictions on sidewalk street vending."

A local authority is not required to enforce all or some of these restrictions. If any additional restrictions other than the ones above are to be enforced, it must be directly related to objective health, safety, or welfare concerns.

"SB 946 allows but does not require a permitting program for local sidewalk vendors." These programs must accept specific ID documents  in lieu of a social security number. The collected number is confidential.

SB 946 does not limit or affect any state food safety laws, including the California retail food code.

SB 946 does not allow any criminal charges, but may allow administrative fines. A violation of the local authority's vending programs is only punishable by the following fines: $100 for the first violation, $200 for the second violation, and $500 for any additional violation within one year of the first violation. If the local authority requires a vending program, the authorities can impose higher fines for vending without a permit: $250 for the first violation, $500 for the second violation, and $1000 for any additional violation within one year of the first violation. On the fourth and any subsequent violation, the local authority can rescind a permit.

SB 946 applies to any pending criminal charges or vindicates any prior convictions.

Controversy

Vendor Cooperation 
While the intent of SB 946 is to aid in the “important entrepreneurship and economic development opportunities” street vending may bring to low-income and immigrant communities, the inability to prosecute vendors with criminal charges has led to issues surrounding vendor cooperation. Despite the passing of city ordinances that require vendors to receive permits and follow certain regulations, some vendors “have chosen to ignore these regulations and bypass the permitting program”. A lack of vendor cooperation has led some cities to create stricter ordinances in hopes of gaining compliance through larger fines, relocations, or confiscation of “stalls and wares”.

Health Permit 
In many California cities, the permitting process required of vendors may also include receiving a food handler health permit, a document certifying the safe preparation of food by vendors. Outdated state retail food code however has caused issues for vendors seeking to comply with these regulations. In an effort to solve this issue, Senate Bill 972 was passed by the California Senate in order to update the food code to simplify the requirements for street vendors. Specifically, the bill introduces street vending into the food code and limits the equipment requirements originally established for food trucks.

References

Further reading 

</ref>

Street vendors
California statutes